This is a list of constructor records in the FIA World Championship since . Bold entries indicate that the constructor has competed in the  season. This page is accurate as of the 2023 Saudi Arabian Grand Prix.

Races entered and started

Total races started
Starts: Number of races where at least one car of the constructor started the race.
Entries: Number of races where the constructor registered or was expected to participate.

Most consecutive races started
Most consecutive races that the constructor entered (was registered) and actually started.

Wins

Total wins

Percentage wins

Most wins in a season

Highest percentage of wins in a season

Most consecutive wins

Most wins in the same Grand Prix

Most consecutive wins in the same Grand Prix

* Sequence ongoing. The Russian Grand Prix was discontinued after the 2021 edition.

Most races started without a win

1–2 finishes

Total 1–2 finishes

Most 1–2 finishes in a season

Most consecutive 1–2 finishes

Podiums

Total podiums

* Races in which the constructor scored one or more podium finishes

Most consecutive races with a podium

Most podiums in a season

Most podiums without a win

Most races started without a podium

Pole positions

Total pole positions

Percentage of pole positions

Most pole positions in a season

Consecutive pole positions

Most pole positions in the same Grand Prix

Total 1–2 qualifying results

Total front-row lockouts
Front row refers to the cars at the front of each column of cars on the starting grid. Since the 1973 German Grand Prix the starting grid has been formed of two columns of cars, so the front row has consisted of two cars. Previously, the front row consisted of either two, three, or four cars.

Most races started without a pole position

Note:  Sauber achieved its only pole position as BMW Sauber.

Fastest laps

Total fastest laps

Most fastest laps in a season

Most fastest laps in the same Grand Prix

Points
Throughout the history of the World Championship, the points-scoring positions and the number of points awarded to each position have varied – see the List of Formula One World Championship points scoring systems for details.

Total points
(ordered by number of Constructors' Championship points)

Most championship points in a season

Most points without a win

Most points without a World Constructors' Championship

Most races started without scoring a point

Championships

Total constructors' championships

Consecutive constructors' championships

Drivers' Championships

Miscellaneous

Notes

References

External links
 StatsF1

Constructor ecords
Formula One